Cuthbert E. Jacobs (born 5 January 1952) is an Antigua and Barbuda sprinter. He competed in the men's 200 metres at the 1976 Summer Olympics.

References

External links
 

1952 births
Living people
Athletes (track and field) at the 1970 British Commonwealth Games
Athletes (track and field) at the 1976 Summer Olympics
Athletes (track and field) at the 1978 Commonwealth Games
Antigua and Barbuda male sprinters
Olympic athletes of Antigua and Barbuda
Commonwealth Games competitors for Antigua and Barbuda
Place of birth missing (living people)